Akinfenwa is a surname. Notable people with the surname include:

Adebayo Akinfenwa (born 1982), English footballer
Joseph Akinfenwa (born 1956), Anglican bishop in Nigeria
Moji Akinfenwa (1930–2019), Nigerian politician

Surnames of African origin